Austin Wentworth (born May 10, 1990) is a former American football offensive guard who played one season with the Minnesota Vikings of the National Football League (NFL). He played college football at California State University, Fresno and attended Whitney High School in Rocklin, California.

Early years
Wentworth played high school football for the Whitney High School Wildcats. He earned Pioneer Valley League lineman of the year as the Wildcats finished with an 11-2 record, was named First-team All-PVC twice, first-team All-metro, first-team All-state, Whitney High School Athlete of the Year and played in the KCRA3 All-Star Classic. He also lettered in track & field as a thrower in the shot put (47-11 or 14.62m) and the discus (131-5 or 40.13m).

College career
Wentworth played for the Fresno State Bulldogs from 2010 to 2013. He was redshirted in 2009. He was named Sports Illustrated honorable mention All-American following his senior season. He was a two-time 1st-Team All-Mountain West selection and finished his career with 43 starts, including 42 consecutive.

Professional career
Wentworth signed with the Minnesota Vikings on May 11, 2014 after going undrafted in the 2014 NFL draft. He was released by the Vikings on August 31 and re-signed to the team on September 2, 2014. He made his NFL debut on October 26, 2014 against the Tampa Bay Buccaneers. Wentworth was released by the Vikings on May 7, 2015.

On May 13, 2015, it was reported that he was retiring due to blood clots in his leg. After surgery, he lost the muscle in his left leg that controlled the up function of his foot and will have to wear a brace for the rest of his life.

References

External links
NFL Draft Scout

Living people
1990 births
Players of American football from Sacramento, California
American football offensive guards
Fresno State Bulldogs football players
Minnesota Vikings players
People from Rocklin, California